Lord David Paul Nicholas Dundas (born 2 June 1945) is an English musician and actor, best known for his chart success in the pop genre during the 1970s as well as his later career in film and television scores.

Biography
Dundas was born in Oxford, the second son of Lawrence Dundas, 3rd Marquess of Zetland, and his wife Penelope Pike. As a younger son of a marquess, he is entitled to the courtesy title 'Lord'. He was educated at Harrow and the Central School of Speech and Drama. While at the Central School, Dundas shared a Camden Town house with actor Vivian MacKerrell and film director Bruce Robinson. The house on Albert Street had been bought by his parents for him to live in, eventually according to Dundas himself "15 people were living there – there were three bedrooms". Those years served as the basis for Robinson's unpublished memoir and the film Withnail & I (1987). Dundas co-wrote the score for the film, considered "one of Britain's biggest cult films".

On 17 December 1971, Dundas married Corinna Maeve Wolfe Scott, and they had two children. They divorced in 1995. Dundas then married Taina Bettina Breuckmann on 21 November 1997, and they had one son.

Musical career
His 1976 single "Jeans On" reached No. 3 in the UK Singles Chart, No. 17 on the US Billboard Hot 100, and No. 1 in the German Singles Chart, where the song remained 19 weeks in the Top Ten.<ref>Günter Ehnert: Hit Bilanz. Deutsche Chart Singles 1956 – 1980. Hamburg: Taurus Press 1990, p. 65</ref> The song originally appeared as a television advertising jingle for Brutus Jeans (the words used in the jingle – "I pull my Brutus jeans on" – were replaced with "I pull my old blue jeans on" for the single release). The single was later sampled by Fatboy Slim for his track "Sho Nuff" which was also used in an advertisement in 2006 for SEAT Ibiza. Dundas's follow-up single, "Another Funny Honeymoon" was a medium-sized hit, reaching No. 29 in the UK. Dundas performed the song live on the BBC Television show, Top of the Pops, in 1977. A later single, "Where Were You Today", based on a C&A radio commercial ("Come and C and A" being replaced by the song title) was less successful.
Jingles made by Dundas for Capital Radio were played daily on the station in the 1970s: "Grab a little piece of heaven, with Roger Scott from 3 to 7" and "Get a little soft rock, country, blues, with Tony Myatt from 11 to 2".

Discography
Albums
 1977 David Dundas (AUS No. 82)
 1978 Vertical Hold 1987 Withnail and I [Motion Picture Soundtrack]

Singles

Film and television (as an actor)
 1968 City '68 (TV series) – Tony Lambert 
 1968 A Man of our Times (TV series) – Roy
 1968 Pere Goriot (TV mini-series) – Eugène de Rastignac
 1968 Prudence and the Pill – Tony Bates
 1968 Boy Meets Girl (TV series) – Mic
 1969 ITV Saturday Night Theatre (TV series) – Matthew Fairchild
 1969 Mosquito Squadron – Flight Lieutenant Douglas Shelton, RAF
 1971 Paul Temple (TV series) – Joe Brand
 1972 Shelley (TV movie) – Thomas Jefferson Hogg
 1973 Weir of Hermiston (TV series) – Frank Innes
 1975 Churchill's People (TV series) – Prince Edward
 1986 When the Wind Blows – credited as an actor

Film and television (as a musician)

 1971 Private Road – co-wrote original score with Michael Feast and George Fenton.
 1972  Weir of Hermiston, BBC Scotland.
 1982 Fourscore – music for the launch of Channel 4, used for over ten years but no longer featured on the channel.
 1983 Daybreak – start up music for TV-am in its early years, also used as the theme to the hour-long early morning news programme of the same name (also on TV-am), initially presented by Robert Kee;
 1986 'Gilding the Lily' – piano score in the style of Erik Satie for the iconic TV commercial for Simple skincare in which robotic arms spray a pristine white lily with colouring and perfume;
 1987 Withnail and I, original score;
 1989 How to Get Ahead in Advertising, co-wrote original score with Rick Wentworth;
 1989 Get Ready – for the rebranding of ITV by English Markell Pockett (and later used in the idents for Border Television in the mid-1990s, it was also used for Tyne Tees Television's non ITV generic idents from 1991 to 1992);
 1992 Freddie as F.R.O.7'', co-wrote original score with Rick Wentworth.
 c. 1993 Television commercials for the Kraft General Foods, Inc. product, "Country Time Lemonade Drink Mix" featured a Dundas composition called "I Keep Your Picture" as background music.
 1998 – another ITV rebranding, under the title "Television from the Heart", for FutureBrand English & Pockett.

See also
List of 1970s one-hit wonders in the United States

References

External links 
 

1945 births
Living people
Musicians from Oxford
Younger sons of marquesses
People educated at Harrow School
Alumni of the Royal Central School of Speech and Drama
British soft rock musicians
English male singers
English male actors
English composers
English people of Scottish descent
Chrysalis Records artists
Jingle composers